My Uncle Archimedes (Czech: Můj strýček Archimedes) is a 2018 Czech comedy film directed by Georgis Agathonikiadis. It stars Ondřej Vetchý and Miroslav Donutil. The film is about Greek communist Archimedes who is forced to leave his country due to Greek Civil War. He comes to Czechoslovakia with his wife and nephew Aris. He befriends his new neighbour Karel Novák.

Cast
 Ondřej Vetchý as Archimedes
 Miroslav Donutil as Karel Novák
 Veronika Freimanová as Jarmila Nováková
 Dana Černá as Penelope
 Jiří Dvořák as State Security Captain
 Tomáš Töpfer as Goldstein
 Oldřich Navrátil as Bureš
 Jaromír Dulava as Chairman of Local Committee
 Stanislav Zindulka as Přibyl
 Kristýna Boková as Simona
 Martin Havelka as Head of the Farm

References

External links
 
 

2018 television films
2010s Czech-language films
Czech comedy films
Czech television films
Czech Television original films
2018 films